The following is the filmography of American actor, animator, writer, producer, director, and composer Trey Parker.

Film

Television

Theatre

Video games

Music videos

Awards and nominations

See also
 List of roles and awards of Matt Stone

Notes

References

External links
 

Director filmographies
Male actor filmographies
Lists of awards received by American actor
South Park
American filmographies